Gustav Kunze (4 October 1793, Leipzig – 30 April 1851, Leipzig)
was a German professor of zoology, an entomologist and botanist with an interest mainly in ferns and orchids.

Kunze joined the Wernerian Natural History Society in Edinburgh in 1817. He later became Zoology Professor at Leipzig University and in 1837 was appointed director of the Botanical Gardens in Leipzig. In 1851 he was elected a foreign member of the Royal Swedish Academy of Sciences.

The plant genus Kunzea was named in his honour.

Works 
 Beiträge zur Monographie der Rohrkäfer. Neue Schrift. Naturf. Ges. Halle, 2 (4): 1-56. (1818). 
 Die Farrnkrauter in Kolorirten Abbildungen: Naturgetreu Erläutert und Beschrieben. 2 volumes (1847-1851).
 Index Filicum (sensu latissimo) in Hortis Europæis Cultarum Synonymis Interpositis Auctus, cura A. Baumanni.  Orig. in Linnaea XXXIII (1850). Pub. as book (1853).
 Zeugophora (Jochträger) eine neue Käfergattung. Neue Schrift. Naturf. Ges. Halle, 2 (4):. 71-76.(1818).
with Philipp Wilbrand Jacob Müller 1822. Monographie der Ameisenkäfer (Scydmaenus Latreille). Schriften der Naturforschenden Gesellschaft zu Leipzig 1: 175–204.

Collection 
His collection is in Naturkundemuseum Leipzig.

See also
 :Category:Taxa named by Gustav Kunze

References 

19th-century German botanists
German mycologists
German entomologists
Members of the Royal Swedish Academy of Sciences
1793 births
1851 deaths
Scientists from Leipzig
German zoologists